Salice Salentino is a red Italian wine produced primarily from the Negroamaro grape in the provinces of Brindisi and Lecce. The wine received DOC status in 1976.

Wines of Apulia
Italian DOC